Hypermerimna is an inability to remove focus from anxiety-producing stimuli, which may be caused by damage to the attention control centers of the brain.

Causes 
Hypermerimna is observed when a subject with anxiety has difficulty in disengaging from novel stimuli, and may be caused by damage to the brain's pre-frontal control regions. The patterns of disrupted attentional control relate to findings of disrupted performance on executive functions tasks, such as working memory across a wide number of different disorder groups.

Treatment 

Hypermerimna may respond to standard treatment for painful conditions if the anxiety is induced by pain, using various drugs such as SSRIs or tricyclic antidepressants.

See also 
 Attentional control

References 

Neurology
Anxiety disorders